Rosalind Harris (born December 22, 1946) is an American theater and film actress. She is best known for her portrayal of Tzeitel, the eldest daughter of Tevye, in the 1971 film version of  Fiddler on the Roof. She also starred as Tzeitel in the Broadway musical, having replaced Bette Midler. Nearly 20 years after the film, Harris played mother Golde in a touring stage revival of Fiddler on the Roof; Topol, the Israeli actor who played her father Tevye in the film, reprised his role, now playing her husband.

Harris also had an extensive theatre career, having performed in leading roles in many musicals in Off Broadway, regional theater and stock. Her credits include: Elsie in Horatio (Arena Stage), Jenny Hill in Major Barbara (American Shakespeare Festival)/& understudy to Jane Alexander, Aldonza in Man of La Mancha, Mama Rose in Gypsy, Leona Samish in Do I Hear a Waltz? (Equity Library Theatre), 10 productions of Funny Girl, as Fanny Brice (her favorite production, at Chateau DeVille Dinner Theatre, was directed by Christopher Hewett, along with original Broadway Musical Director, Milton Rosenstock), and, Off Broadway, as Dora in The Rise of David Levinsky (American Jewish Theatre), Harris made many television commercials as well, and her spot as a "female doctor" in a Mogen David Wine commercial won a Clio Award. In 1993, she was nominated for a MAC Award for her work in the cabaret show, Hollywood Opera, at Don't Tell Mama, in New York City, written by and also starring Barry Keating.

She appeared as Fanny Brice in the 1984 film The Cotton Club, with Richard Gere and Diane Lane, and with Woody Allen in Zelig. After co-starring in 1996 opposite Angela Lansbury, as Mrs. Lowenstein, in the Hallmark Hall of Fame, made-for-television movie, Mrs. Santa Claus,  Harris took time off to create her own vintage and estate jewelry business, “Rosalind’s – As You Liked It”. She garnered excellent reviews in a comeback performance in 2012 as Sadie, in the new musical MisSpelled at the Cherry Lane Theatre,  in 2014 performed at Town Hall in New York City, as part of the 50th Anniversary Gala of Fiddler on the Roof, with Sheldon Harnick, Chita Rivera and Chaim Topol. In summer of 2016, Harris sang at the Museum of Jewish Heritage, in New York, along with other cast members in another Fiddler tribute.

References

External links

Place of birth missing (living people)
Living people
American film actresses
American stage actresses
1946 births
20th-century American actresses
21st-century American actresses